Nampa may refer to:

 Namibia Press Agency
 Nampa, Alberta, a village in Canada
 Nampa, a peak in Gurans Himal, Nepal
 Nampa (game), an eroge series by ELF
 Nampa (Huaorani) (–1956 or 1957), a Huaorani tribesman
 Nampa, Idaho, a city in the United States
 Nanpa, a Japanese social phenomenon
 Anon Nampa, Thai human rights activist

See also 
 Nanpa (disambiguation)